Eibner is a surname of German origin. The meaning is most likely derived from the German adjective eiben, meaning yewen or yew-like. Notable people with the surname include:

Brett Eibner (born 1988), American professional baseball player
John Eibner, American Christian human rights activist
Friedrich Eibner (1826-1877), German painter of Architectural subjects
Vicki Eibner (born 1962), American puppeteer, known for playing Ojo on Bear in the Big Blue House

 
German-language surnames